Gavin Lee Beavers (born April 29, 2005) is an American soccer player who plays as a goalkeeper for Major League Soccer club Real Salt Lake.

Club career 
Beavers is a product of the Real Salt Lake youth academy. He made his senior debut for Real Monarchs, Real Salt Lake's USL Championship affiliate, on June 26, 2021, starting in the 1–1 draw. At the age of 16, Beavers became the youngest ever goalkeeper in the league's history. On September 3, 2021, Beavers signed a professional deal with Real Monarchs.

On January 12, 2022, Beavers signed a homegrown player contract with Real Salt Lake's first team roster in Major League Soccer.

Career statistics

References 

2005 births
Living people
American soccer players
Association football goalkeepers
Real Monarchs players
USL Championship players
People from Henderson, Nevada
Soccer players from Nevada
Real Salt Lake players
Homegrown Players (MLS)
MLS Next Pro players